Nisko is a town in Subcarpathian Voivodeship in south-west Poland.

Nisko may also refer to the following villages:
Nisko, Pomeranian Voivodeship (north Poland)
Nisko, Warmian-Masurian Voivodeship (north-east Poland)